Black Tambourine is a compilation album by American indie pop band Black Tambourine. The album was released in 2010 by Slumberland Records and contains the band's complete recordings up to that point, serving to replace the prior 1999 compilation Complete Recordings. Black Tambourine features six additional previously unreleased tracks, including four new songs recorded in June 2009 specifically for the album.

Track listing

References

Black Tambourine albums
2010 compilation albums